Joseph Kozlowski may refer to:

 Osip Kozlovsky (1757–1831), Russian-Polish composer
 Joseph S. Kozlowski (1912–1992), America artist